Michelle A. Schmidt is United States Army major general who serves as the director of force development of the United States Army since July 2022. She most recently served as the Director for Operations of the Defense Intelligence Agency from July 2021 to June 2022 and before that was the Deputy Chief of Staff for Intelligence of Resolute Support Mission and Director of Intelligence of United States Forces-Afghanistan from July 2020 to July 2021.

References

Living people

Year of birth missing (living people)

Place of birth missing (living people)

Recipients of the Defense Superior Service Medal
Recipients of the Legion of Merit
United States Army generals
United States Army personnel of the War in Afghanistan (2001–2021)